Unakkul Naan [I'm Within You] is a 2016 Tamil film directed by Venkatesh Kumar G.

Plot 
Unakkul Naan plays out through the mind of a young boy who, while watching a film at the theater where his father works as a projectionist, is sent back to school by his father. The boy then embarks on a fantastical journey wherein he experiences the joy of childhood while also coming to understand the reality of human life and its elements. This is a highly experimental feature film was shot inside theatre.

The Film has its World Premiere at the 7th Norway Film Festival 2016 at Oslo, Norway. The Film was telecasted in DoorDarshan as Children's Day Special on 14 November 2016.

References

External links
 http://www.thehindu.com/features/cinema/etcetera/article7092849.ece 
 http://epaper.newindianexpress.com/799562/Indulge-Chennai/06052016#dual/20/1
 http://indulge.newindianexpress.com/made-in-madras-105/section/51387
 https://cinema.maalaimalar.com/cinema/preview/2016/01/24223758/unakkul-naan-movie-preview.vpf
 https://cinema.dinamalar.com/movie-review/1837/Unakkul%20Naan/
 https://tamil.samayam.com/tamil-cinema/movie-review/unakkul-naan-movie-review/moviereview/52091203.cms

2016 films
2010s Tamil-language films